Leptomyxida is an order of Amoebozoa.

It includes species such as Flabellula citata, Paraflabellula hoguae, Paraflabellula reniformis, Rhizamoeba saxonica and Leptomyxa reticulata.

Taxonomy
The taxonomy of Leptomyxida as revised in 2017 recognizes 23 confirmed species:
Order Leptomyxida 
Family Leptomyxidae  
Leptomyxa  — 9 species
Family Rhizamoebidae  
Rhizamoeba  — 3 species
Family Flabellulidae  
Flabellula , (includes former Paraflabellula ) — 10 species 
Family Gephyramoebidae  
Gephyramoeba  — 1 species

References

External links

Amoebozoa orders
Tubulinea